Kelagur is a village in Mudigere Taluk, Chikkamagaluru district in Karnataka, India. It has a population of 396 according to 2011 census. It has a tea plantation located in the village.

References 

Villages in Chikkamagaluru district